Marcello Puglisi (born May 17, 1986 in Trescore Balneario) is an Italian racing driver.

Career

Formula Renault
Puglisi began his car racing career by driving in the Italian Formula Renault Championship and Formula Renault Eurocup in 2003. He remained in the Italian series for three years, with a best finish of 13th in the drivers' championship. In 2003 and 2005 he competed in a total of six Eurocup events, failing to score any points in the process.

Formula Three
In 2005, Puglisi also drove in one race of the Italian Formula Three Championship, scoring three points at his first and only attempt at the formula.

Formula 3000
Puglisi drove in both the Euroseries 3000 and the rival Formula 3000 International Masters championship for 2006. He scored no points in the former, but secured tenth place in the drivers' championship in the latter.

International Formula Master
In 2007, Puglisi competed in the inaugural International Formula Master season. In his most successful year in motorsport yet, he won one race on his way towards fifth in the drivers' championship. He remained in the category for 2008.

Sports Car Racing
Puglisi also drove in a single round of the Le Mans Series in 2007 for the Scuderia Lavaggi team in the LMP1, scoring no points.

GP2 Series
Puglisi was signed by the Piquet Sports team to drive in the first GP2 Asia Series season for 2008. Driving alongside compatriot Marco Bonanomi, he did not score any points. Having committed to another season of Formula Master, he nevertheless took his opportunity to compete in the 2008 GP2 Series proper as a replacement for Davide Valsecchi in the Durango team, who was injured in a high-speed crash at the second round of the championship in Turkey. Puglisi took part in the next round of the championship, but was then replaced by Ben Hanley.

Racing record

Career summary

Complete GP2 Series results
(key) (Races in bold indicate pole position) (Races in italics indicate fastest lap)

Complete GP2 Asia Series results
(key) (Races in bold indicate pole position) (Races in italics indicate fastest lap)

References
Career statistics from driverdb.com. Retrieved on May 23, 2008.

1986 births
Living people
Italian racing drivers
GP2 Series drivers
Italian Formula Renault 2.0 drivers
Formula Renault Eurocup drivers
Italian Formula Three Championship drivers
Auto GP drivers
International Formula Master drivers
GP2 Asia Series drivers
European Le Mans Series drivers
Superstars Series drivers
Sportspeople from the Province of Bergamo
International GT Open drivers
People from Trescore Balneario
Piquet GP drivers
Cram Competition drivers
RP Motorsport drivers
JD Motorsport drivers
Euronova Racing drivers
Durango drivers
Ferrari Challenge drivers